The 2001 Campeonato Brasileiro Série A, known as Brasileirão TAM 2001 by sponsorship reasons, was the 45th edition of the Campeonato Brasileiro Série A. It began on August 1, 2001, and reached its end on December 23, 2001. The competition was won by Atlético Paranaense.

Format
The 28 teams played against each other once. The eight best placed teams qualified to the quarter-finals, in which the eighth-placed team played against the first-placed team, the seventh-placed team played against the second-placed team, the sixth-placed team played against the third-placed team, and the fifth-placed team played against the fourth-placed team. The quarter-finals and the semi-finals were played over one leg while the finals were played over two legs. The four worst teams in the first stage were relegated to the Campeonato Brasileiro Série B of the following year.

First stage standings

Final stage

Finals

Atlético-PR: Flávio; Rogério Corrêa, Nem and Gustavo; Alessandro, Cocito, Adriano, Kléberson and Fabiano (Igor); Ilan (Souza) and Alex Mineiro. Head coach: Geninho.

São Caetano: Sílvio Luiz; Mancini, Daniel, Dininho and Marcos Paulo; Simão, Serginho, Adãozinho and Esquerdinha; Anaílson (Müller) and Magrão. Head coach: Jair Picerni.

São Caetano: Sílvio Luiz; Mancini, Daniel, Dininho and Marcos Paulo (Müller); Simão, Serginho (Bechara), Adãozinho and Esquerdinha (Marlon); Anaílson and Magrão. Head coach: Jair Picerni.

Atlético-PR: Flávio; Nem, Gustavo and Rogério Corrêa (Igor); Alessandro, Cocito (Pires), Adriano, Kléberson and Fabiano; Kléber (Souza) and Alex Mineiro. Head coach: Geninho.

Final standings

Top scorers

References

External links
Campeonato Brasileiro Série A 2001 at RSSSF

Brazil
2001